HMS Lowestoffe was a 28-gun  sixth-rate frigate of the Royal Navy. Named after the UK's most easterly port of Lowestoft in Suffolk the ship was designed by Sir Thomas Slade based on the earlier Lyme of 1748, "with such alterations as may tend to the better stowing of men and carrying for guns." The design provided for a 24-gun ship (from 22 September 1756 this was raised to 28 guns by including the 3 pounders on the quarterdeck in the count) of 583 tons, but on completion the ship measured some 11 tons more.

The ship served in the British operations to relieve Quebec during the Seven Years' War before being wrecked off Pointe-aux-Trembles on 19 May 1760.

References 

 Robert Gardiner, The First Frigates, Conway Maritime Press, London 1992. .
 David Lyon, The Sailing Navy List, Conway Maritime Press, London 1993. .
 Rif Winfield, British Warships in the Age of Sail, 1714 to 1792, Seaforth Publishing, London 2007. .

External links
 

 

Frigates of the Royal Navy
1756 ships
Ships built on the River Thames